Dry firing is the practice of simulating the discharge of a firearm without any live ammunition, or practicing with an inert laser/infrared training platform and may also include the use of a target/feedback system.  The terms also commonly refers to simply "firing" a gun that has no ammunition in it. Concern is commonly expressed that doing so might damage the gun.  
 
Dry fire does not pose any real risk of damage to most modern centerfire firearms; however, it can for rimfire weapons, where the firing pin in most designs will impact the breech face if the weapon is dry-fired.  Because of this, precautions (such as the use of snap caps) are recommended if such a weapon is to be deliberately dry-fired.

Purpose

Dry firing is the practice of simulating the discharge of a firearm without any live ammunition, or practicing with an inert laser/infrared training platform such as an iMarksman or SIRT training pistol, and may also include the use of a target/feedback system, such as the iDryfire or LASR software.  

There are many benefits to dry firing.  Learning is faster and can be safer with dry fire, and it's easier to practice trigger control without developing a flinch, which is a pre-emptive reflex some beginners develop due to being unaccustomed to the trigger weight or anticipating a recoil.  Dry fire also allows shooters to practice trigger control in locations where they couldn't practice with live ammo.  Grip, drawing, sight alignment, trigger control, reloads, troubleshooting malfunctions, and more can be trained during dry fire practice.  The technique allows people to conduct a safe, economical form of training to improve their shooting skills. 

In recent years, a number of companies have developed methods of enhancing dry fire practice to improve skills. Products that illuminate a laser beam, as opposed to a solid projectile, have become increasingly popular.  These include chamber inserts available for various caliber firearms, as well as dedicated training pistols or replacement AR-15 bolt carrier groups. There are also a number of target systems for these laser dry fire training aides, that are becoming more affordable and popular. These products help people get more from dry fire practice by providing feedback on shot placement and times, and make dry fire a more enjoyable experience.  In addition, there are training aids such as training cards that provide shooters a variety of drills to do that will help them develop skills that will carry over to live fire.

Wear and tear
It is generally acceptable to dry fire more modern centerfire firearms without a cartridge or snap cap for limited volume training. Older designs such as the CZ 52 and Colt Single Action Army are exceptions. However, dry firing a rimfire firearm, striker based firearms or guns with angled firing pins (such as revolvers with hammer-mounted firing pins or older shotguns) can damage the gun. Furthermore, damage can occur to the chamber mouth of a rimfire firearm. Ultimately, one should check with the manufacturer of the gun to ascertain if it is safe to dry fire, but a snap cap should be used for all high-volume dry fire training where the firing pin articulates.

Laser dry fire systems 

Some dummy cartridges are equipped with a laser beam (laser cartridge), usually with a red, green or infrared beam so that they can simulate the point of impact. There are also camera systems or other types of sensors to detect hits so that you competitionss can be simulated. Special laser weapons or firearm conversion kits with or without simulated recoil are also available. Some examples of commercial laser training systems are iMarksman, TTRIGGER, SIRT, iDryfire, LASR (Laser Activated Shot Reporter), MantisX, LaserLyte, Laser Ammo, LaserHIT or SCATT. Some examples of open source solutions ShootOFF and HomeLESS.

Laser colors 

Different laser systems can have different technical solutions which are not necessarily compatible. The power of the laser beam is typically around 1-5 mW. The color of the laser is typically either green (520 nm wavelength), red (630-670 nm) or infrared (780 nm, invisible). Red and green lasers can be captured by most ordinary cameras, while special camera may be needed to capture infrared lasers since most ordinary cameras have an infrared filter.

The SIRT (Shot Indicating Resetting Trigger) models from Next Level Training were one of the first major manufacturers of pistol dry training systems, and since then similar products have also been offered by many other manufacturers. Some laser systems have several lasers in the same unit. One such example is the SIRT 110, which has one laser (take-up laser, can be deactivated) that lights up as long as the trigger is pressed past the reset point, and another laser (shot indicator) that lights up after the trigger has been fully triggered and as long as it is held. These two laser beams are supplied by SIRT in combination red/red or red/green respectively, and on the red/green variant the color mapping can be changed by the user with a button. There are also laser modules on the aftermarket so that the SIRT 110 can be converted to other laser colors (infrared/red, meaning that one laser is invisible) for use with an infrared camera that captures wavelengths between 780-940 nm. Using two different laser beams means that a camera system can capture movements in the weapon before and after the shot is fired. Laser pistols used in modern pentathlon have been standardised to have red lasers with a wavelength of 635 to 650 nm.

Pulse duration 
The pulse duration of the laser is measured in milliseconds (ms), and is important for correct detection by target or camera systems. Some systems have user-adjustable pulse lengths. With purely electromechanical dryfire cartridges the duration of the pulse is often mechanically controlled by the firing pin and typically lies around 100 ms, while some other systems have digitally controlled pulses that are shorter, for example 60 ms or 1 ms. These may be required for camera or target systems to be able to correctly detect single shots, and stands in contrast to laser systems that emit a continuous laser beam as long as the trigger is held, such as the SIRT 110. There are also aftermarket conversion kits or pulse modules to convert some laser systems to emit a distinct pulse for use with particular target systems. For example, one manufacturer offers an aftermarket module that is required for use with their target systems, and has a stated pulse duration of 65 ms. Another manufacturer offers a pulse module that emits a 30 ms pulse with each trigger pull, and claims that it works with target systems from both LASR, Laser Ammo and LaserLyte. Laser pistols used in modern pentathlon have been standardised since 2014 to having a pulse length of 15.6 ms. Before 2014 the pulse length was standardised to 25.2 ms.

Laser systems for use with simulated recoil have a very short pulse (in the order of magnitude 6-8 milliseconds) to ensure that the point of impact is not affected too much by the movement in the firearm. This can require the use of high-speed cameras (for example 200 fps), since many ordinary web and phone cameras don't have a quick enough frame rate.

In archery 

Dry firing in archery, also known as "dry loosing", refers to the releasing of a drawn bow without an arrow.  This practice should be avoided as much as possible, because without the mass of the arrow to absorb the elastic energy released, the energy is instead dissipated through vibration of the bowstring and the bow limbs, and can do significant structural damage to the bow itself.  Compound bows are particularly susceptible to damage due to high tension and numerous moving parts.  Dry firing a modern high-energy compound bow even once may cause a combination of cracked limbs, bent axles, string derailment, cam warpage, string/cable failure, cable slide failure, and can even cause the bow to shatter.  While some bows can survive a dry fire with no apparent damage, typically manufacturers do not warrant their bows for dry firing, and any bow that has been dry fired needs to be thoroughly inspected for damage before shooting again.  In particular, the limbs need to be inspected for cracking around cam axles and the opening of the slot where the cams or pulleys fit in (since they tend to tilt sideways during a dry fire).

Crossbows, with their high draw weights, are even more likely to be damaged by dry firing.

Etymology
Recorded from the 1980s, the term "dry fire" was possibly coined as analogous to the phrase "dry run", which is a rehearsal or testing process and in the case of the firearm, one is "testing" the trigger action and observing the hammer or striker drop, without using live ammunition. 
For the expression of "dry run", it has been suggested that the "dry" originates from exhibitions by late-19th-century fire departments in the United States, where drills (runs) were conducted for public viewing without the use of water (dry).

See also
 Gun safety
 Hang fire

References

Firearm training
Firearm terminology